Alfyorovo is a rural locality (a village) in Golovinskoye Rural Settlement, Sudogodsky District, Vladimir Oblast, Russia. The population was 16 as of 2010.

Geography 
The village is located 1.5 km north-east from Golovino, 29 km west from Sudogda.

References 

Rural localities in Sudogodsky District